Digital Emotion is a Dutch euro disco group that originally consisted of Glenn Van Der Hoff and Steve Goede. Their most popular songs were "Get Up, Action", "The Beauty and the Beast" and "Go Go Yellow Screen" (all three were featured in episode 14 of Nu Pogodi), released in the middle of the 1980s. The band has released two albums, Digital Emotion (1984) and Outside In The Dark (1985).

External links
 Digital Emotion at Discogs
 [ Digital Emotion at Allmusic]

Dutch musical groups
Eurodisco groups